Ale Khirtsizhiqo was a Circassian military commander from the Abdzakh region who took part in the Russo-Circassian War.

Biography

Early life 

Not much is recorded about Khirtsizhiqo's early life, as Circassians did not write down their history, and all knowledge comes from Russian sources. Sources state that he was born in the village of Shakh, and was of the Janchate clan. He was reportedly the first person to fly the Circassian flag.

Hostilities with Zass 
In 1833, Grigory Zass was appointed as chief commander of the Russo-Circassian War and was given full authority. Zass' main headquarters was in the Prochnyi Okop fortress.  Khirtsizhiqo Ale along with his comrades of the Circassian army reportedly attacked this base and kidnapped General Zass' daughter. After 3 years, they sent a letter to Zass telling him that they are returning his daughter and agreed on the place and terms of delivery. Circassian negotiators arrived at the appointed time, and they took the girl, dressed in Circassian clothes, off the horse and handed her over to her father. The girl convinced her father to spare the Circassians and both parties returned to their bases.

Death 
Sources state that he died in a battle against the Russians.

References 

North Caucasian independence activists
People of the Caucasian War
Circassian military personnel of the Russo-Circassian War